Nachman of Breslov ( Rabbī Naḥmān mīBreslev), also known as Reb Nachman of Bratslav, Reb Nachman Breslover ( Rebe Nakhmen Breslover), and Nachman from Uman (April 4, 1772 – October 16, 1810), was the founder of the Breslov Hasidic movement. He was particularly known for his creative parables, which drew on Eastern European folktales to create mystical and mythic fantasies and which influenced 20th century literature, probably including the works of Franz Kafka.

Nachman, a great-grandson of the Baal Shem Tov, revived the Hasidic movement by combining (the Kabbalah) with in-depth Torah scholarship. He attracted thousands of followers during his lifetime, and his influence continues today through many Hasidic movements such as Breslov Hasidism. Nachman's religious philosophy revolved around closeness to God and speaking to God in normal conversation "as you would with a best friend". The concept of hitbodedut is central to his thinking.

Biography

Nachman was born on April 4, 1772 (Rosh Chodesh of Nisan) in Międzybóż, then in the Polish–Lithuanian Commonwealth and now in Ukraine.

Nachman's mother, Feiga, was the daughter of Adil (also spelled Udel), daughter of the Baal Shem Tov, founder of Hasidic Judaism. His father Simcha was the son of Nachman of Horodenka (Gorodenka), who was a seventh-generation lineal descendant of Judah Loew ben Bezalel and one of the Baal Shem Tov's disciples, after whom Nachman was named. Nachman had two brothers, Yechiel Zvi and Yisroel Mes, and a sister, Perel.

At the age of 13, he married Sashia, daughter of Rabbi Ephraim, and moved to his father-in-law's house in Ossatin (Staraya Osota today). He acquired his first disciple on his wedding day, a young man named Shimon who was several years older than he was.

In 1798–1799, he traveled to the Land of Israel, where he was visited Hasidim living in Haifa, Tiberias, and Safed. In Tiberias, his influence brought about a reconciliation between the Lithuanian and Volhynian Hasidim. 

Shortly before Rosh Hashana 1800, Nachman moved to the town of Zlatopol.

Move to Bratslav

In 1802, Nachman moved to the town of Bratslav, also known as "Breslov" and "Bracław".

His move to the town of Breslov brought him into contact with Nathan Sternhartz, a 22-year-old Torah scholar in the nearby town of Nemirov. Sternhartz recorded all of Nachman's formal lessons as well as transcribing his work Likutey Moharan. After Nachman's death, Sternhartz recorded informal conversations he and other disciples had had with Nachman, whose works he published with his own commentaries on them.

Nachman and his wife Sashia had six daughters and two sons. Two daughters died in infancy and the two sons both died within a year and a half of their births. Their surviving children were Adil, Sarah, Miriam, and Chayah. Sashia died of tuberculosis in June 1807, and the next month Nachman became engaged to a woman named Trachtenberg. Right after the engagement, Nachman contracted tuberculosis.

Move to Uman
In 1810, after a fire destroyed Nachman's home, a group of maskilim (Jews belonging to the Jewish enlightenment movement) living in Uman invited him to live in their town, and provided housing for him as his illness worsened." Nachman died of tuberculosis at the age of 38 in the early autumn on the fourth day of Sukkot 1810, and was buried in the local Jewish cemetery.

Depression
Based on the frequent fluctuations and changes in Nachman's mood, scholars have suggested that he suffered from severe depression and from bipolar disorder.

Pilgrimage tradition

After Nachman's death Sternhartz instituted an annual pilgrimage to his gravesite on Rosh Hashana, called the Rosh Hashana kibbutz, which drew thousands of Hasidim until 1917, when the Bolshevik Revolution forced it to continue clandestinely. Only a dozen or so Hasidim risked making the annual pilgrimage during the Communist era. During "Perestroika" in Soviet Union in 1989 the gates were reopened. In 2008, approximately 25,000 people from all over the world participated in this annual pilgrimage.

Teachings
Nachman rejected the idea of hereditary Hasidic dynasties, and taught that each Hasid must "search for the tzaddik ('saintly/righteous person')" for himself—and within himself. He believed that every Jew has the potential to become a tzaddik. He emphasized that a tzaddik should magnify the blessings on the community through his mitzvot. However, the tzaddik cannot "absolve" a Hasid of his sins, and the Hasid should pray only to God, not to the rebbe. The purpose of confiding in another human being is to unburden the soul as part of the process of repentance and healing.
In his early life, he stressed the practice of fasting and self-castigation as the most effective means of repentance. In later years, however, he abandoned these severe ascetisms because he felt they may lead to depression and sadness. He told his followers not to be "fanatics". Rather, they should choose one personal mitzvah to be very strict about, and do the others with the normal amount of care.

He encouraged his disciples to take every opportunity to increase holiness in themselves and their daily activities. For example, by marrying and living with one's spouse according to Torah law, one elevates sexual intimacy to an act bespeaking honor and respect to the God-given powers of procreation. He urged everyone to seek out their own and others' good points in order to approach life in a state of continual happiness. He stressed living with faith, simplicity, and joy. He encouraged his followers to clap, sing and dance during or after their prayers to bring them to a closer relationship with God. He taught that his followers should spend an hour alone each day, talking aloud to God in his or her own words, as if "talking to a good friend". This is in addition to the prayers in the siddur. Breslover Hasidim still follow this practice today, which is known as hitbodedut (literally, "to make oneself be in solitude"). Nachman taught that the best place to do hitbodedut was in a field or forest, among the natural works of God's creation. He emphasized the importance of music for spiritual development and religious practice.

Controversy
In 1816, Joseph Perl wrote a denunciation of Hasidic mysticism and beliefs, in which he criticized many of the writings of Nachman, who had died six years earlier. Austrian imperial censors blocked publication of Perl's treatise, fearing that it would foment unrest among the empire's Jewish subjects.

During his lifetime Nachman also encountered opposition within the Hasidic movement itself from people who questioned his new approach. Eventually nearly the entire Jewish population of Zlatipola opposed Nachman, leading him to relocate to Breslov in 1802.

Messianic controversy

Nachman believed at one time that he was the Messiah, and should be recognized as such.

Published works

Reb Nachman's Torah lessons and stories were published and disseminated mainly after his death by his disciple, Reb Noson:

Likutey Moharan ("Collected Teachings of Our Teacher, Rabbi Nachman") (vol. i., Ostrog, 1808; vol. ii., Moghilev, 1811; vol. iii., Ostrog, 1815)—Hasidic interpretations of the Tanakh, Talmud and Midrashim, Zohar, etc. This work has been completely translated to English and annotated in fifteen volumes by Rabbis Chaim Kramer and Moshe Mykoff of the Breslov Research Institute.
Sefer HaMidot (The Aleph-Bet Book) (Moghilev, 1821)—a collection of practical advice gleaned from Torah sources, presented as epigrams or maxims and arranged alphabetically by topic.
Tikkun HaKlali ("General Remedy")—Reb Nachman's order of ten Psalms to be recited for various problems, plus commentary by Reb Noson. Published as a separate book in 1821.
Sippurei Ma'asiyot (Tales of Rabbi Nachman or Rabbi Nachman's Stories) (n.p., 1816)—13 story tales in Hebrew and Yiddish that are filled with deep mystical secrets. The longest of these tales is The Seven Beggars, which contains many kabbalistic themes and hidden allusions. Several fragmentary stories are also included in Rabbi Aryeh Kaplan's translation of the complete tales, Rabbi Nachman's Stories.
Sichot HaRan ("Talks of Rabbi Nachman"): Compilation of the central teachings of Rabbi Nachman, comprising 308 "sichas", mainly presented as anecdotes, concerning Hassidic philosophy and the Service of God, and providing background and remarks re earlier teachings.  Originally an appendix to Sippurei Ma'asiyot.

Another mysterious document that Reb Nachman dictated to Reb Noson is the Megillat Setarim ("Hidden Scroll"), which was written in a cryptic combination of Hebrew initials and brief phrases. Prof. Zvi Mark has researched and attempted to decipher this document, based on disclosures from prominent members of the Breslov community. His findings have been published in Hebrew and in English translation, along with facsimiles of discrepant manuscript copies.

Works he wrote but destroyed 

Nachman also wrote but then destroyed Sefer HaGanuz ("The Hidden Book") and the Sefer HaNisraf ("The Burned Book"). He told his disciples that these volumes contained deep mystical insights that few would be able to comprehend. He dictated the Sefer HaNisraf to Sternhartz, who said that he did not understand it at all and that "What I do remember is that it spoke about the greatness of the mitzvah of hospitality and preparing the bed for a guest". Nachman never showed the Sefer HaGanuz to anyone, and in 1808 he burned all the copies of the Sefer HaGanuz and the Sefer Ha-nisraf.

Nachman first ordered the two manuscripts of the book Sefer HaNisraf to be destroyed in a bargain for his life during a phase of his tuberculosis which preceded his death by two years. He believed that the illness was a "punishment from the upper-world--for writing a book".

Two years later, from his deathbed, he ordered a chest full of his writings to be burnt.

"On the evening of the last day of his life, Rabbi Nachman gave his disciples the key to a chest.  "As soon as I am dead," he told them, "while my body is still lying here on the floor, you are to take all the writings you find in the chest and burn them. And be sure to fulfill my request."

Quotes
"It is a great mitzvah to be happy always."
"If you believe that you can damage, then believe that you can fix."
"Gevalt!!! Never give up hope! There is no despair."
"When a person realizes that he is on a very low level and far from God, this itself is a reason to feel encouraged. Before this, he was so far from God that he did not even know it. Now at least he knows it, and this itself is a sign that he is drawing closer."
"Worldly desires are like sunbeams in a dark room. They seem solid until you try to grasp one."
"It is very good to pour out your heart to God as you would to a true, good friend."
"You are never given an obstacle you cannot overcome."
"The essence of wisdom is to realize how far from wisdom you are."
"All the sages of Israel are in my estimation like a garlic peel."
"Wherever I go, I'm always going to Israel."
"Know that [when] a person needs to cross a very, very narrow bridge, the general principle and main point is not to make oneself at all terrified."

See also
Na Nach Nachma Nachman Meuman

The Rooster Prince

References

Bibliography
  Green, Arthur (1992). Tormented Master: The Life and Spiritual Quest of Rabbi Nahman of Bratslav. Jewish Lights Publishing. 
  Greenbaum, Avraham (1987). Tzaddik: A Portrait of Rabbi Nachman. Jerusalem: Breslov Research Institute. 
  Kaplan, Aryeh (1973). Rabbi Nachman's Wisdom. Jerusalem: Breslov Research Institute.
  Kaplan, Aryeh (2005). The Seven Beggars: & Other Kabbalistic Tales of Reb Nachman of Breslov (Nahman, Nachman). Woodstock, VT: Jewish Lights Publications for the Breslov Research Institute. 
  Kaplan, Aryeh (1985). Until the Mashiach: The Life of Rabbi Nachman. Jerusalem: Breslov Research Institute.
  Kramer, Chaim (1989). Crossing the Narrow Bridge. Jerusalem: Breslov Research Institute. 
  Kramer, Chaim (1992). Through Fire and Water: The Life of Reb Noson of Breslov. Jerusalem: Breslov Research Institute. .
  Sears, Dovid (2010). Breslov Pirkey Avot. Jerusalem: Breslov Research Institute. .
  Mykoff, Moshe (2003). 7th Heaven. Woodstock: Jewish Lights Publishing, with the Breslov Research Institute.

External links

About Rabbi Nachman
Who is Rebbe Nachman ?
The Essential Rabbi Nachman
Publishers
NaNachNation.org
NaNach.org Information Site
Breslov Research Institute
Who Was Rabbi Nahman of Bratslav? by Dr. Henry Abramson

Works
Rebbe Nachman of Breslov and his Stories

 
Hasidic rebbes
Hasidic rabbis in Europe
18th-century rabbis from the Russian Empire
19th-century rabbis from the Russian Empire
People from Medzhybizh
People from Podolia Voivodeship
19th-century deaths from tuberculosis
1772 births
1810 deaths
Descendants of the Baal Shem Tov
Tuberculosis deaths in Ukraine